Nana Agyemang Badu I was a traditional ruler in Ghana and Paramount Chief of Dormaa Traditional Area in the Bono Region. His official title was Dormaahene - King of Dormaa. He was the sixth president of the National House of Chiefs and served from 1978 to 1982. He was the first not to be affiliated to the asante region to head the National House of Chiefs since its inception. He was also the head of the Brong Ahafo regional House of Chiefs. He was the founding father of the Dormaa Secondary School also known as Dormas which is located in the heart of Dormaa Ahenkro Bono Region. Osagyefo was a close friend of the late Rtd.Ft. Lt.Jerry John Rawlings who was usually seen at the Kwafie festival. In his private life, Osagyefo was a medical doctor.

Osagyefo visited his ancestors in January 1998. His successor is Agyemang Badu II, his nephew.

References 

Kwafie Festival

Dormaa Ahenkro

People from Bono Region
Ghanaian leaders